PSA PF1 platform is a global subcompact platform used by the French automotive group PSA Peugeot Citroën.

Larger PSA models used the PF2 and PF3 platforms.

Models
Vehicles based on the PF1 platform:

 1998 Peugeot 206/206+, essentially a mix of the 106/Saxo and PF1 platform
 2002–2009 Citroën C3 I
 2003–2012 Citroën C3 Pluriel
 2003–2009 Citroën C2
 2005–2009 Peugeot 1007
 2006–2014 Peugeot 207
 2009–2021 Citroën C3 II
 2009–2017 Citroën C3 Picasso
 2010–present IKCO Runna
 2010–2021 Citroën C3 Aircross/C3 Picasso/Aircross (Latin America)
 2010–2019 Citroën DS3
 2012–present Peugeot 208
 2013–present Peugeot 2008
 2012-present Peugeot 301
 2012-present Citroën C-Elysée/Dongfeng Junfeng EV30/Dongfeng Fukang e-Elysée
 2014–2020 Citroën C4 Cactus
 2014–present Citroën C3-XR/C3L
 2016–present Citroën C3 III - platform renamed to 'Platform A' for media coverage 
 2017–present Opel/Vauxhall Crossland X/Crossland
 2017–present Citroën C3 Aircross
 2021–present IKCO Tara
 2023–IKCO Rira / Ray
 2023–IKCO P21

References

PSA platforms